Poul Bjørndahl Astrup (4 August 1915 – 30 November 2000) was a Danish clinical chemist famous for inventing a CO2 electrode and co-inventing the concept of base excess.

References

External links
 Poul Astrup - blodgasser, syrer og baser  Ugeskrift for Læger 2007;169(35):2896 

Danish medical researchers
Acid–base chemistry
1915 births
2000 deaths
Clinical chemists
Danish biochemists